Kalabaydh is a town which is part of the Maroodi Jeex region of Somaliland

Demographics
The total population of Kalabaydh is
50,000 and is primarily inhabited by people from the Somali ethnic group.

References

Cities in Somaliland